Charley Creek is a stream in the U.S. state of Washington. It is a tributary of Asotin Creek.

Charley Creek was named after Charles Lyon, a pioneer settler.

See also
List of rivers of Washington

References

Rivers of Asotin County, Washington
Rivers of Garfield County, Washington
Rivers of Washington (state)